In the Studio is the third studio album by British ska revival band the Specials. It was released under the name the Special AKA in June 1984, their only album under that name. The album took over two years to produce before finally seeing release, by which time the original Specials had long since disbanded.

In the Studio was ranked No. 3 among the "Albums of the Year" for 1984 by NME. It charted in the UK Top 35. It was not as commercially successful as their previous two albums, although "(Free) Nelson Mandela" became an international hit single.

Track listing 
All tracks composed by Jerry Dammers except where noted.
 "Bright Lights" (John Bradbury, Stan Campbell, Dick Cuthell, Dammers) – 4:11
 "The Lonely Crowd" (Campbell, Dammers, John Shipley) – 3:52
 "What I Like Most About You Is Your Girlfriend" – 4:50
 "Housebound" – 4:13
 "Night on the Tiles" (Dammers, Shipley) – 3:04
 "(Free) Nelson Mandela" – 4:07
 "War Crimes" – 6:13
 "Racist Friend" (Bradbury, Cuthell, Dammers) – 3:49
 "Alcohol" – 5:01
 "Break Down the Door" (Bradbury, Cuthell, Dammers) – 3:36

Personnel 
The Special AKA
 Stan Campbell – vocals
 Rhoda Dakar – vocals, backing vocals
 Jerry Dammers – organ, piano; vocals on "What I like Most About You Is Your Girlfriend"
 Gary McManus – bass guitar
 John Shipley – lead guitar
 John Bradbury – drums; bass and synthesizer on "Break Down the Door"
Additional personnel
 Rico Rodriguez – trombone
 Dick Cuthell – flugelhorn
 Andy Aderinto - saxophone
 Claudia Fontaine – backing vocals on "What I Like Most About You Is Your Girlfriend"
 Edgio Newton – vocals, percussion 
 Horace Panter – bass guitar on "What I Like Most About You Is Your Girlfriend", "War Crimes" and "Alcohol"
 Roddy Radiation – lead guitar on "Racist Friend"
 Lynval Golding - backing vocals on "Night On the Tiles"
 Nigel Reeve – saxophone
 Tony "Groko" Utah - percussion on "The Lonely Crowd"
 Dave Heath - flute on "Nelson Mandela"
 Paul Speare - penny whistle on "Nelson Mandela"
 Nick Parker - violin on "War Crimes"
 Dave Wakeling, Elvis Costello, Lynval Golding, Molly Jackson, Polly Jackson, Ranking Roger - backing vocals on "Nelson Mandela"
 Caron Wheeler – backing vocals on "What I Like Most Like About You Is Your Girlfriend"
 Naomi Thompson - backing vocals on "What I Most Like About You Is Your Girlfriend"
Technical
 Jerry Dammers - production
 Dick Cuthell - production on "The Lonely Crowd" and "War Crimes"
 Elvis Costello - production on "Nelson Mandela"
 Alvin Clark, Colin Fairley, Dick Cuthell, Jeremy Green, Mark Freegard, Teri Reed - engineer
 John A. Rivers, Steve Churchyard - rhythm track engineering
 Nigel Reeve – remastering coordination
 Noel Summerville – remastering
 Adrian Thrills – sleeve notes
 David Storey – album cover design

References 

1984 albums
The Specials albums
Albums produced by Elvis Costello
2 Tone Records albums